Francis E. Rivers (died July 28, 1975) was an American lawyer and judge who served in the New York State Assembly. His father, David Foote Rivers, was a state representative in Tennessee. He was a Republican.

He was the first African American to serve on the City Court of New York City (now the New York City Civil Court). In 1932, W. E. B. Du Bois wrote to Rivers seeking information about Dr. Hinton of Boston who Du Bois wanted to nominate for a Spingarn Medal.  In 1966 he presented an award to Thurgood Marshall.

Several prominent members of the American Bar Association threatened to quit when Rivers was denied membership in the organization, which did not have any African American members.  He defeated incumbent Abraham Grenthal in the 1929 election for state Assembly  and served in the 153rd New York State Legislature in 1930.

See also
List of African-American jurists
List of first minority male lawyers and judges in New York
African-American officeholders during and following the Reconstruction era

References

Year of birth missing
1975 deaths
African-American judges
African-American state legislators in New York (state)
20th-century American politicians
New York (state) state court judges
20th-century American judges
Municipal judges in the United States
Republican Party members of the New York State Assembly
African-American men in politics